Azal (אצל), or Azel, is a location mentioned in the Book of Zechariah 14:5, in Bibles that use the Hebrew Masoretic Text as the source for this verse. In Bibles that follow the Greek Septuagint (LXX) rendering, depending upon the source manuscript used, Azal is transcribed Jasol (ιασολ, pronounced "Yasol"), Jasod (a corruption of Jasol), or Asael (ασαηλ):

Theories on location
No written work prior to the late 19th-century definitively identifies what, or where, Azal is or was. Most Bible commentators of the late 19th century considered it to be a place near Jerusalem.  Cyril of Alexandria wrote in his commentary on the Book of Zechariah, Chapter 14. that Azal was known to be “a town situated at the far point of the mountain".

French Orientalist and archaeologist Charles Simon Clermont-Ganneau, who identified the site of the ancient Canaanite city of Gezer and preserved the Mesha Stele inscription, claimed that Schwarz was referring to al-Eizariya, the traditional Bethany of New Testament times.

Between 1873 and 1874, Clermont-Ganneau explored many tombs in a valley immediately south of Jerusalem, which the peasants of Silwan called . Based on geographic and linguistic evidence, Clermont-Ganneau proposed that Wady Yasul is Azal. Currently, this valley is bordered on the west by the Jerusalem Peace Forest and the neighborhood of Talpiot, on the north by the Abu Tor neighborhood on the southern slope of the Hill of Evil Council, and on the south by the neighborhood of Jabel Mukaber on the ridge where the former UN headquarters sits. The mouth of the valley lies at the base of the southernmost summit of the Mount of Olives (Mount of Corruption).

There is evidence that Clermont-Ganneau's theory and the LXX rendering of Zechariah 14:5 are correct. In 1984, Israeli geologists Daniel Wachs and Dov Levitte identified the location of a large landslide on the Mount of Olives that is directly adjacent to both Wady Yasul (Nahal Atzal) and the area of the ancient King's Gardens at the juncture of the Hinnom and Kidron Valleys. Wachs' and Levitte's discovery validates Jewish historian Flavius Josephus' account of an earthquake-caused landslide during King Uzziah's reign blocking up the kings' gardens in the valley. Additionally, the Israelis officially named this valley אצל (Atzal), which is the same Hebrew spelling of Azal (אצל).

References 

Biblical archaeology
Hebrew Bible places